Chinese adjectives differ from adjectives in English in that they can be used as verbs (for example ;  "sky black ") and thus linguists sometimes prefer to use the terms static or stative verb to describe them.

Attributive (before nouns)
When a noun is modified using an adjective, the associative particle  de is inserted between the adjective and the noun. For example,  gāo xìng  hái zi "happy child".   is sometimes omitted to reduce repetitiveness (e.g., two or more instances of  within a sentence); it is also omitted in some established adjective-noun pairs to improve sentence flow (e.g., the TV show  in China). It is also more typical to omit  when a single-syllable adjective is used than for a multi-syllable adjective (e.g., compare  with ). In general, there are no strict rules regarding when  can be omitted; however, some adjectives and adjective-noun pairs are more often seen without the associative particle than others.

Some examples:
   （）— "bad person"
    — "strange person"
    （）— "cute panda"

Predicative (after nouns)

First pattern 
Unlike English, subjects and predicate adjectives in a Chinese sentence are not linked by copula but by degree adverbs, such as  hěn "very,"  hǎo "highly",  zhēn "really," and  fēicháng "extraordinarily, extremely."  For example, the following sentences express increasing degrees of "beauty":

A complementary adverb (e.g.  jí le) can also specify the degree of an adjective:

NB:  often functions as a dummy linking adverb and does not carry the meaning of "very". For example,  is often understood and translated as "She is beautiful".

Besides, in colloquial Chinese the pattern "" (sǐ le, literally "to death") or "" is sometimes used in exaggeration to highlight the extent of influence, where AA is an adjective and BB is the thing being affected. Examples include
"" ( rè = hot) - meaning "It's so hot [to the extent that I cannot bear any more]"
"" ( è = hungry) - meaning "[I feel] so hungry [to the extent that I cannot bear any more]"
"" - meaning "I feel so hot [to the extent that I cannot bear any more]"

Second pattern
The linking verb  shì (to be) is used with adjectives in the pattern—Noun +  + Adj + —to state or emphasize a fact or a perceived fact. For example:

Since  is a possessive particle, and the following noun is understood here, more precise translations would be "He is a male one", "That car is a new one", and "That cat is a black one".

Parts of speech
Chinese pronouns
Chinese verbs
Chinese particles
Chinese grammar

Adjectives